The Fond du Lac State Forest is a state forest in Minnesota, United States, principally managed by the Minnesota Department of Natural Resources (MDNR). The main segment of the forest is located between the towns of Sawyer and Cromwell, in Carlton County. The boundaries of the forest overlap with those of the Fond du Lac Indian Reservation, some state forest land falls within the reservation. The Kettle Lake Wildlife Management Area (also managed by the MDNR) is located in the southern half of the main segment. A smaller segment is located adjacent to Jay Cooke State Park and the border with Wisconsin in Saint Louis County.

Overview and history
The forest is a mixture of coniferous boreal forest, alder-willow brushlands, lowland bogs, and wild rice (Zizania palustris) laden lakes. The current forest cover was largely influenced by the 1918 Cloquet Fire and the controlled burns that took place until the 1930s, as well as the drainage of area lowlands from 1916 to 1920 for the purposes of homesteading.

Recreation
Outdoor recreation opportunities in the forest include camping and hiking throughout the forest, canoeing, kayaking, and swimming on the numerous lakes, as well as picnicking at picnic shelters. Trails located throughout the forest include  designated for cross-country skiing,  for mountain biking,  each for Class I and Class II All-terrain vehicle (ATV) use,  for off-highway motorcycling, as well as snowmobiling.

See also
List of Minnesota state forests

References

External links
Fond du Lac State Forest - Minnesota Department of Natural Resources (DNR)
Fond du Lac State Forest Trails

Minnesota state forests
Protected areas of Carlton County, Minnesota
Protected areas of St. Louis County, Minnesota
Protected areas established in 1933
1933 establishments in Minnesota